Chico Buarque de Hollanda is the first album by Brazilian musician Chico Buarque. It was released in 1966 in 12-track vinyl format.

Track listing

In popular culture 
The album's cover art became a viral internet meme with "happy" Chico and "sad" Chico. Buarque explained in an interview October 2019 that he wanted a photo that would project the image of a serious composer, while the record company, Rádio Gravações Especializadas, wanted a photo of him smiling, and that the result is what it is. Laughing, Buarque noted that whenever he sees the cover—as a meme or not—he thinks to himself: "How absurd is this."

References 

1966 albums
Chico Buarque albums
Portuguese-language albums
Albums produced by Manuel Barenbein